Tales from the Secret Annex is a collection of miscellaneous prose fiction and non-fiction  written by Anne Frank while she was in hiding during the Nazi occupation of The Netherlands. It was first published in The Netherlands in 1949, then in an expanded edition in 1960. A complete edition appeared in 1982, and was later included in the 2003 publication of The Revised Critical Edition of The Diary of Anne Frank. These stories show what life in the Annex was like. For example, one story describes Mrs. Van D’s ‘dentist appointment’. Others show life before the Annex, such as telling on the class for cheating. Anne also describes loneliness in the Annex, like missing her friends.

A revised British edition was published in 2010 by Halban Publishers. 

Along with her posthumously published diary, written in hiding between 1942 and 1944 and published in 1947, Anne Frank wrote short stories, essays, personal recollections, and the first five chapters of a novel. The latter was written in the back half of one of her diary notebooks, while the short pieces were compiled into a journal begun on September 2, 1943. Entitled Verhaaltjes, en gebeurtenissen uit het Achterhuis beschreven door Anne Frank (Stories and events from the Backhouse described by Anne Frank), it was recovered with her other manuscripts from her hiding place by Miep Gies and Bep Voskuijl following Anne Frank's arrest by the Gestapo on August 4, 1944.

Further reading

By Anne Frank
 Tales from the Secret Annex, Anne Frank (1956 and revised 2003)
 Anne Frank: The Diary of a Young Girl - The Definitive Edition, Anne Frank.  Doubleday, 1995.   (Hardcover) Unabridged version includes deletions from first edition.
 The Revised Critical Edition of The Diary of Anne Frank, Anne Frank, edited by David Barnouw and Gerrold van der Stroom. Doubleday, 2003. .
 Anne Frank's Tales from the Secret Annexe, Halban Publishers, 2010. Revised UK edition.

Biography
 Anne Frank Remembered, Miep Gies and Alison Leslie Gold, 1988.  (paperback).
 The Last Seven Months of Anne Frank, Willy Lindwer. Anchor, 1992.  (paperback). 
 Anne Frank: Beyond the Diary – A Photographic Remembrance, Rian Verhoeven, Ruud Van der Rol, Anna Quindlen (Introduction), Tony Langham (Translator) and Plym Peters (Translator). Puffin, 1995.  (paperback).
 Anne Frank: The Biography, Melissa Muller, Bloomsbury 1999.
 Memories of Anne Frank: Reflections of a Childhood Friend, Hannah Goslar and Alison Gold. Scholastic Paperbacks, 1999.  (paperback). 
 Roses from the Earth: the biography of Anne Frank, Carol Ann Lee, Penguin 1999.
 My Name Is Anne, She Said, Anne Frank, Jacqueline van Maarsen, Arcadia Books 2007.

1949 short story collections
Books by Anne Frank
Dutch literature
Personal accounts of the Holocaust
Unfinished books
Books published posthumously